Norman Turnbull  (1879 – 1954) was born in Tyneside and lived for a good part of his life in Gosforth, Newcastle with his four west Highland terriers peter, John, phylis and brown teeth. 

He worked as a shipping clerk/surveyor in Grey Street, Newcastle. He wrote dialect songs as a hobby and was like Leonard Barras and  Jack Robson in providing a rich source of materials for the local BBC Radio show "Wot Cheor Geordie" and working on the show with performers such as Bobby Thompson, Northumberland Serenaders, the Willie Walker Band and The Five Smith Brothers.

His songs include "What Cheor Geordie", "The Pitman's Lament", "Alang the Roman Wall", "Amble Feast", "The Barn Dance Hustle".

See also 
Geordie dialect words
Bobby Thompson
Jack Robson
Wot Cheor Geordie

References

English songwriters
People from Newcastle upon Tyne (district)
Musicians from Tyne and Wear
1954 deaths
1879 births
Geordie songwriters